Gutter Days was a 2003 10" vinyl EP re-release of Kïll Cheerleadër's second demo CD, originally released in 2001.

Some CD-R versions of "Gutter Days" included a cover of the Ramones song, "I Just Wanna Have Something to Do". 4 of the 7 songs found on this EP were re-recorded (and in some instances also renamed) for their 2004 debut full-length album, All Hail.

Track listing 
"R.N.R."
"Don't Call Me Baby, Baby"
"Nikki"
"I Want Action"
"Straight To Hell"
"Shit City"
All songs arranged by Cheerleadër 666

Personnel 
 Ethan Deth - Vocals, Bass
 Cobra (Anthony Useless, T. War) - Vocals, Guitar
 Dallas MacKinnon (Chad MacKinnon) - Lead Guitar
 Jimmy Nova - Drums

Cover art 
The cover art for the album is a picture of Peter Fonda from the movie "The Wild Angels". It was taken from the back cover of the soundtrack LP of that 1966 movie.

Album reviews 
Sleazegrinder, November 2003 review

Kïll Cheerleadër albums
2001 EPs